William Wilkins (December 20, 1779 – June 23, 1865) was an American judge and politician from Pennsylvania who served as a Jacksonian member of the United States Senate from 1831 to 1834 and as a Democratic member of the United States House of Representatives for Pennsylvania's 21st congressional district from 1843 to 1844.  He served as a member of both houses of the Pennsylvania General Assembly, a United States district judge of the United States District Court for the Western District of Pennsylvania, United States Minister to Russia and the 19th United States Secretary of War.

Early life and education
Wilkins was born on December 20, 1779, in Carlisle, Pennsylvania, to Captain John Wilkins, a captain in the American Revolution, and Catherine Rowan. Wilkins attended the Pittsburgh Academy, the forerunner of the University of Pittsburgh. He read law in 1801 and graduated from Dickinson College in 1802. He was admitted to the bar and entered private practice in Pittsburgh, Pennsylvania from 1801 to 1806.  He was "second" in a duel in 1806 which resulted in the death of a Mr. Bates.  It was the last recorded duel in Pennsylvania before the Pennsylvania General Assembly outlawed the practice.  Bates was very popular and Wilkins left Pennsylvania due to the duel to live with his brother Charles Wilkins in Lexington, Kentucky.

He continued private practice in Lexington, Kentucky from 1806 to 1807. He resumed private practice in Pittsburgh from 1808 to 1815. He assisted in organizing the Pittsburgh Manufacturing Company in 1810. He was the first President of the Bank of Pittsburgh. He was President of the Pittsburgh City Council from 1816 to 1819. He was a Federalist member of the Pennsylvania House of Representatives from 1819 to 1820. He was President Judge of the Pennsylvania Court of Common Pleas for the Fifth Judicial District from 1820 to 1824.

In the 1820s, Wilkins and George M. Dallas were leaders in the Family Party faction of the Democratic Party.  The faction was named Family Party since Wilkins, Dallas and several other key leaders were all related by marriage.  The Family Party had political strength and were able to place the defeated governor William Findlay as a U.S. Senator in 1821.

Federal judicial service

Wilkins was nominated by President James Monroe on May 10, 1824, to a seat on the United States District Court for the Western District of Pennsylvania vacated by Judge Jonathan Hoge Walker. He was confirmed by the United States Senate on May 12, 1824, and received his commission the same day. His service terminated on April 14, 1831, due to his resignation.

Congressional races during his judicial tenure

Wilkins was an unsuccessful candidate for election in 1826 to the 20th United States Congress. He was elected as a Jacksonian Democrat to the 21st United States Congress, but resigned before qualifying, never taking his seat.

United States Senate and diplomatic service

Wilkins was elected as a Jacksonian Democrat to the United States Senate from Pennsylvania and served from March 4, 1831, to June 30, 1834, when he resigned. He was Chairman of the United States Senate Committee on the Judiciary from the 22nd United States Congress and Chairman of the United States Senate Committee on Foreign Relations for the 23rd United States Congress. Following his departure from Congress, Wilkins served as United States Minister to Russia for the United States Department of State from 1834 to 1836. He resumed private practice in Pittsburgh from 1836 to 1843. He was an unsuccessful candidate for election to the 27th United States Congress in 1840.

United States House service

Wilkins was elected as a Democrat from Pennsylvania's 21st congressional district to the United States House of Representatives of the 28th United States Congress and served from December 4, 1843, to February 14, 1844, when he resigned. He was Chairman of the United States House Committee on the Judiciary for the 28th United States Congress.

Later career

Wilkins was appointed as the 19th United States Secretary of War by President John Tyler, serving from 1844 to 1845. Wilkins was aboard the  when one of its guns exploded in 1843 near Mount Vernon. The explosion killed two members of John Tyler's cabinet. Wilkins had expressed disapproval of the firing and had moved away from the gun moments before the explosion.

He resumed private practice in Pittsburgh starting in 1845. He was a member of the Pennsylvania State Senate for the 22nd district from 1857 to 1858.  He again resumed private practice in Pittsburgh from 1858 to 1865. He was a major general of the Pennsylvania Home Guards in 1862.

Death
Wilkins died on June 23, 1865, in Homewood, now a neighborhood in Pittsburgh, and was interred in Homewood Cemetery.

Family
Wilkins married Catherine Holmes however she died in 1816 and he was remarried to Mathilda Dallas.  Wilkins' brother John Wilkins Jr. served as a major general in the United States Army.  His sister, Nancy, married Ebenezer Denny, the first mayor of Pittsburgh.  His nephew, Harmar Denny, was a U.S. Congressman from Pennsylvania.  His nephew, Ross Wilkins, was a notable jurist in Michigan.

Legacy
Wilkins founded the Pittsburgh neighborhood of Homewood in 1832. 

He is the namesake of Wilkins Township, Allegheny County, Pennsylvania.

References

Sources

External links
 
 
 

|-

|-

1779 births
1865 deaths
People from Carlisle, Pennsylvania
American people of Welsh descent
United States Secretaries of War
Tyler administration cabinet members
Jacksonian United States senators from Pennsylvania
Chairmen of the Senate Committee on Foreign Relations
Democratic Party members of the United States House of Representatives from Pennsylvania
Democratic Party United States senators from Pennsylvania
1832 United States vice-presidential candidates
Democratic Party members of the Pennsylvania House of Representatives
Democratic Party Pennsylvania state senators
Pittsburgh City Council members
Ambassadors of the United States to Russia
19th-century American diplomats
Judges of the United States District Court for the Western District of Pennsylvania
United States federal judges appointed by James Monroe
United States federal judges admitted to the practice of law by reading law
Judges of the Pennsylvania Courts of Common Pleas
19th-century American judges
American bankers
Pennsylvania lawyers
Dickinson College alumni
University of Pittsburgh alumni
Burials at Homewood Cemetery